Birbhum Pharmacy School is a college of pharmacy in Birbhum, West Bengal, India. It is affiliated to Maulana Abul Kalam Azad University of Technology (M.A.K.A.U.T., formerly West Bengal University of Technology) and approved by the All India Council for Technical Education  (A.I.C.T.E) and Pharmacy Council of India (P.C.I).

It was established in 2017 and is established for providing with degree in B.Pharm (Bachelor of Pharmacy) for undergraduate courses in the field of Pharmaceutical science and technology.   the college is still under construction and its management committee is trying the best to provide the facilities to its students. 

The principal of the college is Dr. Satyendranath Giri who holds a PhD in Pharmacy from Jadavpur University.

External links

Maulana Abul Kalam Azad University of Technology
Educational institutions established in 2018
Pharmacy schools in India
2018 establishments in West Bengal